Utricularia petertaylorii is an annual terrestrial carnivorous plant that belongs to the genus Utricularia (family Lentibulariaceae). It is endemic to southwestern Western Australia. It is named in honor of Peter Taylor.

See also 
 List of Utricularia species

References 

Carnivorous plants of Australia
Eudicots of Western Australia
petertaylorii
Lamiales of Australia